Sparassis (also known as cauliflower mushroom) is a genus of parasitic and saprobic mushroom characterised by its unique shape and appearance and is found around the globe.  Its appearance can be described as similar to a sea sponge, a brain or a head of cauliflower, hence its popular name.

It is increasingly cultivated and sold in Korea, Japan, the United States and Australia.

The generic name comes from the Greek sparassein, meaning to tear.

Species

The following species are recognised in the genus Sparassis:
Sparassis americana R.H. Petersen
Sparassis brevipes Krombh.
Sparassis crispa (Wulfen) Fr.
Sparassis cystidiosa Desjardin & Zheng Wang
Sparassis foliacea St.-Amans
Sparassis herbstii Peck
Sparassis kazachstanica Shvartsman
Sparassis laminosa Fries
Sparassis latifolia Y.C. Dai & Zheng Wang
Sparassis miniensis Blanco-Dios & Z. Wang
Sparassis minoensis Blanco-Dios & Z. Wang
Sparassis nemecii Pilát & Veselý 
Sparassis radicata Weir
Sparassis simplex D.A. Reid 
Sparassis spathulata (Schwein.) Fr.
Sparassis subalpina Q. Zhao, Zhu L. Yang & Y.C. Dai 
Sparassis tremelloides Berkeley

The best-known and most widely collected species are S. crispa (found in Europe and eastern North America) and S. radicata (found in western North America). These species have a very similar appearance and some authorities treat them as conspecific. Their colour ranges from light brown-yellow to yellow-grey or a creamy-white cauliflower colour. They are normally 10 to 25 cm tall but can grow to be quite large, with reported cases of fruiting bodies more than 50cm tall and 14 kg in weight. Their unique look and size means they are unlikely to be mistaken for any poisonous/inedible mushrooms. They grow as parasites or saprobes on the roots or bases of various species of hardwoods, especially oak, and conifers, and hence are most commonly found growing close to fir, pine, oak or spruce trees.

Edibility
Sparassis crispa can be very tasty but should be thoroughly cleaned before use. The folds may contain dirt and other material because, as it grows, the basidiocarp envelops objects such as pine needles. Italian gastronome Antonio Carluccio said that European S. crispa should be picked when creamy white, because once yellow it is too indigestible to eat. It is suitable for drying and reconstituting because it retains its cartilaginous texture and hence is good for soups.

S. radicata is also edible, as is S. spathulata, a cauliflower mushroom which looks similar to Grifola frondosa.

S. crispa is also widely used in traditional Chinese medicine because it contains active pharmacological ingredients. In order to study its medicinal value better, the genomic sequence of S. crispa was published in October 2018. The dry weight of the basidiocarp was found to contain up to 43.6% Beta-glucan, which was approved for the treatment of cancer  in Japan and most recently recommended for COVID-19 patients to overcome inflammation.

Experiments suggest that S. crispa contains chemicals that may stimulate the immune system and has many biological properties including: anti-tumor, antiviral activity (reverse transcriptase inhibitory activity), neuroprotection, cardioprotection, anti-inflammation, hyperlipidemia, anti-diabetic medication, antimicrobial compounds, and methicillin resistant Staphylococcus aureus (MRSA).

See also
Medicinal fungi

References

Further reading 
 Burdsall HH, Jr. 1988. Type studies and nomenclatural considerations in the genus Sparassis. Mycotaxon 31:199–206.
 Wang Z, Binder M, Dai Y-C, Hibbett DS. 2004. Phylogenetic relationships of Sparassis inferred from nuclear and mitochondrial ribosomal DNA and a protein-coding gene (rpb2). Mycologia 96:1013-1027.
 Kiyasko AA, Zmitrovich IV. 2013. Red Book of Kabardino-Balkaria Cherkessk:210.

Edible fungi
Taxa described in 1819
Fungi in cultivation
Polyporales
Fungal tree pathogens and diseases
Taxa named by Elias Magnus Fries
Polyporales genera